Final Battle was a two-night professional wrestling pay-per-view (PPV) event produced by the U.S.-based wrestling promotion Ring of Honor (ROH). It took place on December 18 and 19, 2015 at the 2300 Arena in Philadelphia, Pennsylvania. It was the 14th event under the Final Battle chronology.  The first night was a pay per view broadcast, and the second night was a set of tapings for ROH's flagship TV show Ring of Honor Wrestling.

In the first night, nine matches took place with one in the pre-show. In the main event, Jay Lethal defeated A.J. Styles to retain the ROH World Championship. In another prominent match of the event, Adam Cole defeated Kyle O'Reilly in a grudge match. Other matches in the undercard, Roderick Strong retained the ROH World Television Championship against Bobby Fish, War Machine defeated The Kingdom to win the ROH World Tag Team Championships, Alex Shelley, Matt Sydal and A. C. H. defeated The KRD (The Addiction (Christopher Daniels and Frankie Kazarian) and Chris Sabin), and Michael Elgin defeated Moose.

Storylines
Final Battle featured professional wrestling matches that involved wrestlers from pre-existing scripted feuds or storylines that play out on ROH's television program, Ring of Honor Wrestling. Wrestlers will portray heroes (faces) or villains (heels) as they follow a series of events that build tension and culminate in a wrestling match or series of matches.

On September 18, 2015, at All Star Extravaganza VII A.J. Styles defeated Roderick Strong, Michael Elgin, and Adam Cole to become the number one contender to the ROH World Championship. On November 4, 2015, ROH announced that A.J. Styles would take his championship match at Final Battle 2015 against ROH World Champion Jay Lethal.

In November, Roderick Strong issued an open challenge to the world for his ROH World Television Championship. On November 21, 2015, Bobby Fish answered the challenge, claiming his victory over Roderick Strong in Chicago on September 12, 2015, was enough for him to be number one contender. Roderick Strong accepted the challenge and purposed for it to take place at Final Battle.

On September 18, 2015, at All Star Extravaganza VII The All Night Express would return to defeat The Briscoes in an open challenge. At Glory By Honor XIV The Briscoes would tie it up with a win over King and Titus. On November 27, ROH Matchmaker Nigel McGuiness announced that it would be The Briscoes vs. The All Night Express at Final Battle 2015 for the number one contendership to the ROH World Tag Team Championship. The Young Bucks would interrupt causing Nigel McGuiness to throw them into the mix making it a three-way tag match at Final Battle to face The Kingdom or War Machine at ROH's next pay-per-view event.

At Survival of the Fittest (2015) Michael Elgin won the Survival of the Fittest tournament, earning him an ROH World Championship match. Moose who was also in the Survival of the Fittest tournament was defeated by Michael Elgin in a 3-Way Match between Elgin, Moose, and Adam Cole. Moose would be upset with Elgin causing Moose's manager Stokely Hathaway to issue a challenge to Elgin at Final Battle. Michael Elgin would accept, and Nigel McGuiness would sign for Moose vs. Michael Elgin at Final Battle 2015.

At Best in the World 2015 Dalton Castle defeated Silas Young. At All Star Extravaganza VII Silas Young defeated Dalton Castle earning Dalton Castle's boys. On December 4, it was announced that Dalton Castle would go head to head with Silas Young one more time at the Final Battle pay per view.

Results

Night 1 (PPV)

Night 2 (TV Tapings)

See also
List of Ring of Honor pay-per-view events

References

Events in Philadelphia
2015 in Pennsylvania
2015
Professional wrestling in Philadelphia
December 2015 events in the United States
2015 Ring of Honor pay-per-view events